Dragør Boldklub (DB for short) is a Danish football club in Dragør on the island of Amager. Dragør Boldklub's last spell in the highest football league in Denmark was in War Tournament of 1944/45, where they ended the season with a 6th place in their group – the club's best league result. The club was founded 21 May 1907 and is the oldest existing association football club on the island. In 2008–2009, the club participated in the professional superstructure, FC Amager.

Club's honours

Domestic
 Københavnsserien (V)
 Winners (3): 1972 (A), 1978, 2005
 Runner-Up (1): 1977 (A)

Achievements
4 seasons in the Highest Danish League
0 seasons in the Second Highest Danish League
13 seasons in the Third Highest Danish League
1 seasons in the Fourth Highest Danish League

References

External links

 Official website 

Football clubs in Denmark
1907 establishments in Denmark
Dragør Municipality
Amager